Sajwan Nagar is an old village in Ghaziabad known as Village Shahbad Urf Mitthepur is an old village in the Ghaziabad district of Uttar Pradesh, India. While it was established in 1989, Village Shahbad Urf Mitthepur Sajwan Nagar has been average developed. This village under Ward No-48. Now this village is progressing slowly-slowly & electricity is available on this village. Electricity had inaugurated by Atul Garg is an Indian politician from Ghaziabad. He is a member of the Uttar Pradesh Legislative Assembly.

Village Shahbad Urf Mitthepur Sajwan Nagar(Village Shahbad Urf Mitthepur) is one of Ghaziabad's oldest villages. Its name was changed from Shahbad Urf Mitthepur to Sajwan Nagar after the village was purchased from farmers. Shahbad Urf Mitthepur village was purchased by Puran Singh Sajwan is dealer of this land of Village Shahbad Urf Mitthepur, Sajwan Nagar (Ward No-48). This land is located at NH-24 Hindon River behind Antriksh Sanskriti Apartment, Vijay Nagar, Pratap Vihar, Ghaziabad Uttar Pradesh.

References

Neighbourhoods in Ghaziabad, Uttar Pradesh